Abarema racemiflora is a species of plant in the family Fabaceae. It is endemic to the areas of Turrialba and Ciudad Quesada in Costa Rica.

References

racemiflora
Vulnerable plants
Endemic flora of Costa Rica
Taxonomy articles created by Polbot